Kish (Sumerian: Kiš; transliteration: Kiški;; Akkadian: kiššatu, near modern Tell al-Uhaymir) is an important archaeological site in Babil Governorate (Iraq), located 80 kilometers south of Baghdad and 12 kilometers east of the ancient city of Babylon. The Ubaid period site of Ras al-Amiyah is 8 kilometers away. It was occupied from the Ubaid to Hellenistic periods. In Early Dynastic times the city's patron deity was Inanna with her consort Enki. Her temple, at Tell Ingharra, was (E)-hursag-kalama. By Old Babylonian times the patron deity had become Zababa, along with his consort, the goddess Bau. His temple Emeteursag (later Ekišiba) was at Uhaimir.

History

Kish was occupied from the Ubaid period (c.5300-4300 BC), gaining prominence as one of the pre-eminent powers in the region during the Early Dynastic Period when it reached its maximum extent of 230
hectares.

Early history
The Sumerian king list states that Kish was the first city to have kings following the deluge, beginning with Ĝushur. Ĝushur's successor is called Kullassina-bel, but this is actually a sentence in Akkadian meaning "All of them were lord". Thus, some scholars have suggested that this may have been intended to signify the absence of a central authority in Kish for a time. The names of the next nine kings of Kish preceding Etana are Nanĝišlišma, En-tarah-ana, Babum, Puannum, Kalibum,  Kalumum, Zuqaqip, Aba, Mašda, and Arwium. These names are all Akkadian words for animals, e.g. Zuqaqip "scorpion". The East Semitic nature of these and other early names associated with Kish reveals that its population had a strong Semitic (Akkadian speaking) component from Early Dynastic I period on. Archaeological finds from the Uruk period indicate that the site was part of the Uruk Expansion and hence originally Sumerian and Sumerian language speaking. Ignace Gelb identified Kish as the center of the earliest East Semitic culture which he calls the Kish civilization, however the concept was discarded by more recent scholarship in 2021. According to legend, after the flood, the kingship was given to Kish, with Etana as king. Ancient Sumerian sources describe Etana as 'the shepherd who ascended to Heaven and made firm all the lands'. This implies a cultural belief that Etana stabilized the kingdom by bringing peace and order to the area after the Flood. Etana is also sometimes credited with the founding of Kish.

The twenty-first king of Kish on the list, Enmebaragesi, who is said to have captured the weapons of Elam, is the first name confirmed by archaeological finds from his reign. He is also known through other literary references, in which he and his son Aga of Kish are portrayed as contemporary rivals of Dumuzid, the Fisherman, and Gilgamesh, early rulers of Uruk.

Some early kings of Kish are known through archaeology, but are not named on the King list. These include Utug or Uhub, said to have defeated Hamazi in the earliest days, and Mesilim, who built temples in Adab and Lagash, where he seems to have exercised some control.

After its early supremacy, Kish declined economically and militarily, but retained a strong political and symbolic significance. Its influence reached as far west as the city of Ebla near the Mediterranean Sea, as shown by the Ebla tablets. Just as with Nippur to the south, control of Kish was a prime element in legitimizing dominance over the north of Mesopotamia. Because of the city's symbolic value, strong rulers later claimed the traditional title "King of Kish", even if they were from Akkad, Ur, Assyria, Isin, Larsa or Babylon. One of the earliest to adopt this title upon subjecting Kish to his empire was King Mesannepada of Ur.

Sargon of Akkad, the founder of the Akkadian Empire, came from the area near Kish, called Azupiranu according to a much later Neo-Assyrian text purporting to be an autobiography of Sargon.

Later history

After the fall of the Akkadian Empire, Kish became the capital of a small independent kingdom. One king, named Ashduniarim, ruled around the same time as Lipit-Ishtar of Isin. By the early part of the First Dynasty of Babylon, during the reigns of Sumu-abum and Sumu-la-El, Kish appears to have come under the rule of another city-state, possibly Kutha. Iawium, king of Kish around this time, ruled as a vassal of kings named Halium and Manana. Sumu-la-El conquered Kish and, later, subjugated Halium and Manana, bringing their territories into the expanding Babylonian Empire. The First Dynasty kings Hammurabi and Samsu-iluna undertook construction at Kish, with the former restoring the city's ziggurat and the latter building a wall around Kish. By this time, the eastern settlement at Hursagkalama had become viewed as a distinct city, and it was probably not included in the walled area.

After the Old Babylonian period, however, Kish appears to have declined in importance; it is only mentioned in a few documents from the later second millennium BC. During the Neo-Assyrian and Neo-Babylonian periods, Kish is mentioned more frequently in texts. However, by this time, Kish proper (Tell al-Uhaymir) had been almost completely abandoned, and the settlement that texts from this period call "Kish" was probably Hursagkalama (Tell Ingharra).

After the Achaemenid period, Kish completely disappears from the historical record; however, archaeological evidence indicates that the town remained in existence for a long time thereafter. Although the site at Tell al-Uhaymir was mostly abandoned, Tell Ingharra was revived during the Parthian period, growing into a sizeable town with a large mud-brick fortress. During the Sasanian period, the site of the old city was completely abandoned in favor of a string of connected settlements spread out along both sides of the Shatt en-Nil canal. This last incarnation of Kish prospered under Sasanian and then Islamic rule, before finally abandoned during the later years of the Abbasid Caliphate (750–1258).

Archaeology

After irregularly excavated tablets began appearing at the beginning of the twentieth century, François Thureau-Dangin identified the site as being Kish. Those tablets ended up in a variety of museums. Because of its close proximity to Babylon (of which early explorers believed it was part) the site was visited by a number of explorers and travelers in the 19th century, some involving excavation, most notably by the foreman of Hormuzd Rassam who dug there with a crew of 20 men for a number of months. Austen Henry Layard and also Julius Oppert dug some trenches there in the early 1850s. None of this early work was published. A French archaeological team under Henri de Genouillac excavated at Tell Uhaimir for three months in January 1912, finding some 1,400 Old Babylonian tablets which were distributed to the Istanbul Archaeology Museum and the Louvre. At Tell Bander he uncovered Parthian materials.

Later, a joint Field Museum and University of Oxford team under Stephen Langdon excavated from 1923 to 1933, with the recovered materials split between Chicago and the Ashmolean Museum at Oxford. The main focus of the excavations was at Tell Ingharra and Tell Uhaimir. The actual excavations at Tell Uhaimir were led initially by E. MacKay and later by L. C. Watelin. Work on the faunal and flora remains was conducted by Henry Field. A bone awl from Phase 2 in the YWN area, the transition between Early Dynastic and Akkadian periods, was accelerator radiocarbon dated to 2471–2299 BC (3905 ± 27 C14 years BP).

More recently, a Japanese team from the Kokushikan University led by Hideo Fuji and Ken Matsumoto excavated at Tell Uhaimir in 1989-89, 2000, and 2001. The final season lasted only one week. Work was focused mainly on Tell A with some time spent at the plano-convex building.

In the Chicago expedition to Kish in 1923-1933, several other sections are included:
Tell Ingharra – Twin ziggurats and Neo-Babylonian Temple Complex.
Area P: Located in the Northern part of Kish which the Plano-convex Building resided
Mound A, which includes a palace and a cemetery
Tell H, identified roughly as "The Sasanian Settlement"

Tell Uhaimir
This site consists of three subtells (T, X, and Z). Tell Z was the location of one of the main ziggurats which at Tell X a 1st Millennium BC fort was uncovered and at Tell T some Old Babylonian structures. Between Uhaimir and Ingharra are three smaller tells and further east Tell W where an entire Neo-Babylonian archive was found consisting of about 1000 tablets.

Tell Ingharra

Located in the eastern side of the ancient Kish, Tell Ingharra was extensively explored during the Chicago excavation and provided the best known archaeological sequence in the 3rd millennium BC site. The site consists of several subtells (A, B, D, E, F, G, H, and Tell Bandar which is made up of Tells C and V). In particular, the 1923 excavation concentrated heavily on mound E with its twin ziggurats, while the Neo-Babylonian temple was one of the two buildings that was properly described in a published report.

The twin ziggurats were built of small plano-convex bricks in a herringbone fashion on the summit of Tell Ingharra. The larger one is located on the south-west side of the temple and the smaller one on the south-east side. The excavation report mainly focused on the larger ziggurat while there had been only one report on the smaller one by Mackay. Based on the findings from the larger ziggurat, it is suggested that the structures were built at the end of the Early Dynastic IIIa period to commemorate the city. The fascination of the ziggurats was interesting to the excavators as it was the only Early Dynastic structure that was not destroyed or obscured by later reconstructions, which was why it provided valuable evidence of that time period.

As for the temple complex, the findings of the temple had determined that the mound was part of the city of Hursagkalama. It was used as an active religious centre until after 482 BC. They also had identified the builder as Nabonidus or Nebuchadnezzar II based on the bricks with inscriptions and barrel cylinder fragments reported in the temple.

Area P

This area, north of tell W, was unearthed during the second excavation season (1923-1924) led by Mackay, which uncovered the 'Plano-convex building' (PCB). But outstanding discoveries in Palace A rapidly overshadowed the contemporary excavation here, and the building remained partially uncovered.

Revealed by its stratigraphy and pottery assemblage was the existence of three distinct architectural phases. The earliest archaeological occupation dates back to the ED II period. Above it, rested the massive ED III construction – the PCB. Multiple rooms in the PCB exhibited layers of ashes and charcoals with arrowheads and copper blades, attested that the PCB suffered significant destruction twice during the late ED III period. After its destruction, the PCB was abandoned. Located above later floors of the PCB were scattered burials during the Akkadian period.

The 'Plano-convex building'

The Plano-convex building was a fortified construction built extensively with plano-convex bricks. It displayed the socio-economic dynamics at Kish during the ED III period. No characteristic linking the building to a religious construct.  Instead, the Plano-convex building is recognized as a public building associated with the economical production of beer, textile and oil.  The PCB might have also housed the administrative center powered by the elites. First recognized by Margueron, scholars have divided the building into four main sectors based on the architectural layout:
Sector A: Production area
Sector B: Inconclusive but arguably an administration area
Sector C: Unknown but exhibit a high degree of segregation
Sector D: Private, domestic area for housing activities

Mound A
Mound A, which includes a cemetery and a palace, was discovered during 1922-1925 excavations conducted by Ernest Mackay, under the Field Museum and Oxford University. Although it was earlier a part of the Ingharra mounds lying about 70 meters to the north, it is now separated by an alluvial valley. The seals and other artifacts found in the graves, dating back to a later age than the palace, show that the site was used as a cemetery even in the pre-Sargonic times.

The Sumerian Palace
The palace, which was unearthed beneath the mound, had fallen into decay and was used as a burial ground during Early Dynastic III. It comprises three sections - the original building, the eastern wing and stairway, and the annex. The original building, which was composed of unbaked plano-convex bricks (23 x 15 x 3.50-6 cm), had extremely thick walls, while the annex, which was added later to the south of the building, had comparatively thinner walls. A 2.30 m wide passage was constructed within the outer wall of the original building to prevent invaders from entering the structure.

The archaeological findings within the palace lack pottery items, the most remarkable among them was a fragment of slate and limestone inlay work, which represents the scene of a king punishing a prisoner.

Tell H

In the 1923-1933 Expedition, Tell H became the focus of its final three seasons (1930-1933). Due to personal reasons of the excavators, the Kish material in this section remained selective, mainly yielding Sasanian pottery, coins, incantation bowls and so on. The dating of this section crossed a range of periods, with layer upon layer built on the site. Evidence shows that in the Early Dynastic III Period, there once even existed a twin city. Therefore, the city occupies a relatively unsettled presence in chronology. But from the excavation, eight buildings were identified as from the Sasanian period, thus making this place primarily identified as the Sasanian Settlement. Researchers suspect that some of the buildings might function together as a complex serving different purposes, including royal residence, storage, and administration.

The most prominent finding is the stucco decoration in the first two buildings, while the 1923-1933 team also figured out the floor plan and architectural structure of others. It was partly through these stucco decorations that researchers identified the royal resident to be Bahram V (420-438 AD)—Sasanian kings had their distinctive crowns separately, and the unique crown pattern on stucco served as evidence to support this argument. In Kish, which once functioned as a transfer station between Ctesiphon and Hira, Bahram V built palaces for summer entertainment, which explains why one of the buildings has a huge water tank in the middle, probably functioning to cool down the court in summers. Around Bahram V’s palaces, a group of Sasanian people also took residence and developed a system of settlement and commercial activities.

Gallery

See also
Cities of the Ancient Near East
Tell (archaeology)
Short chronology timeline

Notes

References
Algaze, G., "Private Houses and Graves at Ingharra. A Reconsideration", Mesopotamia 18-19, pp. 135-195, 1983-84
Charvat, Petr, "The Kish Evidence and the Emergence of States in Mesopotamia."., Current Anthropology, vol. 22, no. 6, pp. 686–88, 1981
Charvat, Petr, "Earliest History of the Kingdom of Kiš", P. Charvát and P.M. Vlčková (eds.), Who Was King? Who Was Not King? The Rulers and the Ruled in the Ancient Near East, Institute of Archaeology of the Academy of Sciences, Prague, pp. 16-23, 2010
T. Claydon, "Kish in the Kassite Period (c. 1650 – 1150 B.C)", Iraq, vol. 54, pp. 141–155, 1992
 I. J. Gelb, Sargonic Texts in the Ashmolean Museum, Oxford, Materials for the Assyrian Dictionary 5, University of Chicago Press, 1970 
McGuire Gibson, "The Archaeological uses of Cuneiform Documents: Patterns of Occupation at the City of Kish", Iraq, vol. 34, iss. 2, pp. 113–123, Autumn 1972
Harden, D.B, "A Typological Examination of Sumerian Pottery from Jamdat Nasr and kish.", Iraq 1, pp. 30-44, 1934

Seton Lloyd, "Back to Ingharra: Some Further Thoughts on the Excavations at East Kish", Iraq, vol. 31, no. 1, pp. 40–48, 1969
E. Mackay, "Report on the excavation of the ‘A’ Cemetery at Kish, Mesopotamia: Part I." Anthropology, Memoirs, vol. 1, no. 1, Chicago: Field Museum, 1925. 
 E. Mackay, "A Sumerian Palace and the "A" Cemetery: Part 2", Anthropology Memoirs, vol. 1, no. 2, Chicago: Field Museum,1929
Molleson, Theya, and Joel Blondiaux., "Riders' bones from Kish, Iraq.", Cambridge Archaeological Journal 4.2, pp. 312-316, 1994
P. R. S. Moorey, "A Re-Consideration of the Excavations on Tell Ingharra (East Kish) 1923-33", Iraq, vol. 28, no. 1, pp. 18–51, 1966
P. R. S. Moorey, "The Terracotta Plaques from Kish and Hursagkalama, c. 1850 to 1650 B.C.", Iraq, vol. 37, no. 2, pp. 79–99, 1975
P. R. S. Moorey, "Kish Excavation 1923–1933", Oxford: Oxford Press, 1978 ISBN 9780198131915
P. R. S. Moorey, "The 'Plano-Convex Building' at Kish and Early Mesopotamian Palaces", Iraq, vol. 26, no. 2, pp. 83–98, 1964
P. R. S. Moorey, "Cemetery A at Kish: Grave Groups and Chronology", Iraq, vol. 32, no. 2, pp. 86–128, 1970
Nissen, Hans "The early history of the ancient Near East, 9000–2000 B.C." Chicago/London: University of Chicago Press, 1988.)  Elizabeth Lutzeir, trans.
Sa'di al-Ruwayshdi, "A Comparison Between the Palace at Kish and Later Palaces", vol. 30, no. 1-2, pp. 47-49, 1974
Watelin, L.Ch., "Rapport sur les Fouilles de kish", Journal Asiatique 215, pp. 103-116, 1929
Watelin, L.Ch., "Note sur l’Industrie Lithique de kish", L’Anthropologie 39, pp. 65-76, 1929
Weiss, Harvey, and Mcguire Gibson., "Kish, Akkad and Agade.", Journal of the American Oriental Society, vol. 95, no. 3, pp. 434-453, 1975, doi:10.2307/599355.
Norman Yoffee, "The Economics of Ritual at Late Old Babylonian Kish", Journal of the Economic and Social History of the Orient, vol. 41, no. 3, pp. 312–343, 1998
Wu Yuhong and Stephanie Dalley, "The Origins of the Manana Dynasty at Kish and the Assyrian King List", Iraq, vol. 52, pp. 159–165, 1990
Zaina, F., "Craft, Administration and Power in Early Dynastic Mesopotamian Public Buildings. Recovering the Plano-convex Building at Kish", Iraq, Paléorient, vol. 41, p. 177–197, 2015

Zaina, F. "The urban archaeology of early Kish: 3rd millennium BCE levels at Tell Ingharra", (OrientLab Series Maior 5), Bologna, Ante Quem, 2020

External links

Online Kish Collection at the Field Museum
Field Museum 'reuniting' scattered collections from ancient Iraq site - ScienceDaily -  25-Oct-2004
YouTube video on Field Museum Kish effort
Kish Site photographs at Oriental Institute of Chicago

Populated places established in the 6th millennium BC
Populated places disestablished in the 13th century
Archaeological sites in Iraq
Sumerian cities
Former populated places in Iraq
Babil Governorate
Kish civilization
Former kingdoms